Coleophora strigosella is a moth of the family Coleophoridae. It is found in Portugal, Spain and France.

The larvae feed on the leaves of Quercus species.

References

strigosella
Moths of Europe
Moths described in 1960